Pranahita wildlife sanctuary is a protected area located in Mancherial district (Old Adilabad District) of Telangana State, India.

This sanctuary is on the bank of Pranahita River, 35 km away from Mancherial town. It is famous for Blackbuck and over 20 species of reptiles, over 50 species of birds, over 40 species of mammals.

History 
Pranahita was established on 13 March 1980, and covers an area of 136.02 km2. Pranahita is a southern tropical dry deciduous forests, with dry shrub jungle and grasslands.

Visiting time 
Best time to visit the place is in November to April.

There are forest rest houses at Mancherial and Chennur.

The air temperature varies from 15 to 40 degrees Celsius.

How to Reach 
By Road:

Hyderabad – Karimnagar- Mancherial – 258 km

By Rail:

Hyderabad to Mancherial – 236 km

By Air:

Nearest airport – Hyderabad

References

Central Deccan Plateau dry deciduous forests
Wildlife sanctuaries of Telangana
Adilabad district
Tourist attractions in Hyderabad, India
1980 establishments in Andhra Pradesh
Protected areas established in 1980